Ogasawarana ogasawarana is a species of land snail with an operculum, a terrestrial gastropod mollusk in the family Helicinidae, the helicinids.

Distribution
This species is endemic to Japan.

Description 
Ogasawarana ogasawarana was originally described under the name Kaliella ogasawarana by American malacologist Henry Augustus Pilsbry in 1902.

Pilsbry's original text (the type description) appeared in the key and it reads as follows:

References
This article incorporates public domain text from the reference.

External links 
 http://www.biodic.go.jp/rdb_fts/before/495.html

Molluscs of Japan
Helicinidae
Gastropods described in 1902
Taxonomy articles created by Polbot